Troieschyna-2 is a station on the Livoberezhna Line of the Kyiv Light Rail system. It was opened on October 26, 2012.

Troieschyna-2 is a terminus station located after the Romana Shukhevycha station. It is directly connected to the Kyiv Urban Electric Train's eponymous Troieschyna-2 railway stop, with which it forms a combined transit complex.

References

External links
 
 

Kyiv Light Rail stations
Railway stations opened in 2012
2012 establishments in Ukraine